Claudiu Grozea (born 14 October 1982) is a Romanian speed skater. He competed in the men's 5000 metres event at the 2006 Winter Olympics.

References

External links
 

1982 births
Living people
Romanian male speed skaters
Olympic speed skaters of Romania
Speed skaters at the 2006 Winter Olympics
Sportspeople from Ploiești